This is a list of non-human apes of encyclopedic interest. It includes individual chimpanzees, gorillas, orangutans, bonobos, and gibbons that are in some way famous or notable.

Actors

 Bam Bam, an orangutan, played Precious on the soap opera Passions.
 Buddha, an orangutan, played Clyde in the Clint Eastwood action-comedy film Any Which Way You Can (1980). Buddha was allegedly beaten to death by his trainer for stealing doughnuts from craft services. The weapon was an axe handle wrapped in newspaper and had been nicknamed a "Buddha club" since it had been previously used to discipline him. This claim has been disputed by the author William Munns. 
 Çarli (born 1993), a chimpanzee, starred in the live-action movie The Jungle Book (1994) and in the Turkish television series Çarli before retiring to Monkey World in Dorset, UK.

 C.J., an orangutan, played in the 1981 film Tarzan the Ape Man.
 Clara, a chimpanzee, played Livingston in the movie comedy Delicatessen (1991).
 Evie (short for Evolution), a chimpanzee, played robot dog Muffit II in the original 1978 Battlestar Galactica television series.
 J. Fred Muggs (a chimpanzee born 1952) was a "co-host" with Dave Garroway on NBC's Today Show in the 1950s.
Jiggs, a chimpanzee, was the first Cheeta in the Tarzan films in the 1930s.
 Jimmy, a chimpanzee, appeared in the film Dark Venture
 Joe Martin, an orangutan, who appeared in several silent-era American films
 Judy, a pet chimpanzee of the family, was depicted in the 1960s CBS series Daktari. She also played Penny Robinson's alien chimpanzee-like pet, Debbie, in the simultaneously running Lost in Space.
 Kwanza (or Kwan), a gorilla, played Sidney in the romance movie Return to Me (2000) with Minnie Driver and David Duchovny. Kwan resides at Lincoln Park Zoo in Chicago.
 Louie, a juvenile chimpanzee actor, played on numerous music videos and TV commercials; he starred in the popular Carpet Monkey commercials in 2007 for Human Giant on MTV. Louie retired to Little Rock Zoo with his brother Mikey in 2008. Louie died at the zoo in August 2011 from an immunodeficiency disorder, one week short of his seventh birthday.
 Manis, an orangutan, played Clyde in the Clint Eastwood action-comedy film Every Which Way But Loose (1978), but not in the 1980 sequel Any Which Way You Can, as the animal had outgrown his part. His successor died shortly after the film.
 Mowgli, a chimpanzee, was a guest on CNBC's Dennis Miller Live and on Monk.
 Napoleon and Sally were two chimpanzees which starred in more than 40 shorts around 1916.
 Oscar, a young chimpanzee, was the subject of a 2012 Disney documentary, Chimpanzee.
 Pankun, a chimpanzee, was featured in Japanese TV shows Tensai! Shimura Dobutsu-en (Genius! Shimura Zoo) and the TBS program Dobutsu Kiso Tengai! (Unbelievable Animals!) with bulldog James.
 Peggy, a chimpanzee, played Bonzo in the 1951 movie comedy Bedtime for Bonzo, costarring Ronald Reagan.
 Pierre of Vienna, Austria, an orangutan "trained for motion picture work," reportedly nursed a grudge against a brutal trainer for a long time and when the opportunity arose circa early 1922 that they were alone together high in a tree "strangled the trainer and threw his body to the ground."
Anonymous, sometimes known as his pseudonym Bonzo, acted in the 1952 film Bonzo Goes to College.
 Project X, a 1987 science fiction suspense-drama film about military animal experimentation, directed by Jonathan Kaplan, starred Matthew Broderick, Helen Hunt, and a multitude of chimpanzee actors:
 Arthur—Winston
Brimdom—Dandy
 Clafu—Spike
 Andy—Lulea
 Harry—Ginger
 Karanja—Goliath
 Lucy—Razzberry
 Luke—Bluebeard
 Lulu—Ethel
 Mousie—New Recruit
 Okko—Goofy
 Willie—Virgil (film's animal star)
 Sam (1989-2010), an orangutan, played Dunston in the 1995 movie comedy Dunston Checks In; he was trained by Larry Madrid.
 Zippy, a chimpanzee, rollerskated on United States television in the 1950s.
 Tango, an orangutan, played Suzanne in Kevin Smith's Jay and Silent Bob Strike Back (2001).
 Jonah and his twin, Jacob, both appeared as the chimpanzee Pericles in 2001's Planet of the Apes, Trunk Monkey, and with Tango in Jay and Silent Bob Strike Back.
 Mikey, a chimpanzee, appeared in the film  Manchurian Candidate  (2005), and on Saturday Night Live (2005) and the World Series of Poker (2006).
 Travis, a chimpanzee, gained fame through parts he had in commercials (Old Navy and Coca-Cola) in the 2000s, but was shot by police following a brutal attack on a 55-year-old woman in Stamford, Connecticut.
 Tanga, a chimpanzee, played Inga in Dario Argento's 1985 horror film Phenomena.

Artists 
 Congo (1954–1964)—chimpanzee, abstract impressionist of the late 1950s
 Koko (1971–2018)—gorilla, widely believed to be able to communicate with humans through sign language
 Michael (1973–2000)—silverback gorilla, impressionist painter, was taught American sign language with Koko
 Peter, alias Pierre Brassau, a chimpanzee, was the subject of a famous hoax through which the chimpanzee's paintings were presented as the avant-garde works of unknown French (human) artist "Pierre Brassau".

Science and exploration 

 Abang (born 1966)—orangutan, taught to use and make a stone tool (cutting flake)
 Ai (born 1976)—chimpanzee, studied by scientists at Primate Research Institute, Kyoto University
 Ayumu (born 2000)—chimpanzee, studied by scientists at Primate Research Institute, Kyoto University
 Bonnie—orangutan, began whistling (mimicking an animal caretaker), which is changing ideas about primate sound repertoires
 Chantek (1977–2017)—orangutan, involved with language research and ApeNet language-using great ape ambassador
 Clint—chimpanzee, source of DNA for Chimpanzee Genome Project, Yerkes Primate Center
 Cooper—chimpanzee, studied by Renato Bender and Nicole Bender for swimming and diving behavior in apes 
Digit—mountain gorilla (died 1977) - Gorilla researcher Dian Fossey's favorite mountain gorilla, for whom a charity fund is named to help protect mountain gorillas
 Enos (died 1962)—chimpanzee, 1961 NASA Project Mercury orbiter, second chimpanzee in space and the third primate (and only non-human primate) to orbit the Earth
 Flo (died 1972)—chimpanzee, key member of the Kasakela Chimpanzee Community studied by Jane Goodall; received an obituary in the Sunday Times
 Frodo (1976–2013)—chimpanzee, baby-eating "bully", attacked Jane Goodall and Gary Larson
 Gua—chimpanzee; raised as a child by the Drs. Kellogg alongside their son Donald
 Ham (1956–1983)—chimpanzee; the first great ape to travel to space, Ham's 1961 NASA Project Mercury suborbital flight occurred 11 months before Enos' orbital mission.
 Jenny—orangutan, encountered and described by Charles Darwin in March 1838 at London Zoo.
 Kanzi (born 1980)—bonobo, involved with language research and tool invention, ApeNet language-using great ape ambassador
 Koko (1971–2018)—gorilla, involved with sign language research and ApeNet language-using great ape ambassador
 Lana—chimpanzee, reared at Yerkes National Primate Research Center as part of its language analogue project
 Loulis—chimpanzee, involved in ape hand-signing research
 Lucy—chimpanzee, cross-fostered and raised by University of Oklahoma psychotherapist
 Moja—chimpanzee, involved in ape hand-signing research
 Nim Chimpsky (1973–2000)—chimpanzee, named after linguist Noam Chomsky
 Nyota (born 1998)—bonobo, Panbanisha's son
 Oliver (1957-2012)—chimpanzee, the so-called "Missing Link", apparent "humanzee"
 Panbanisha—bonobo at the same research center as Kanzi
 Panpanzee (1985-2014)—chimpanzee at the same research center as Kanzi
 Sarah (1959-2019)—research chimpanzee whose cognitive skills are documented in The Mind of an Ape
 Sultan—chimpanzee, used in classic Kohler tool-use studies
 Suryia—orangutan, studied by Renato Bender and Nicole Bender for swimming and diving behavior in apes 
 Titus (1974–2009)—gorilla, an extensively observed silverback mountain gorilla
 Viki—chimpanzee, one of the first apes used in ape language experiments
 Washoe (1965–2007)—chimpanzee, pioneer ape of hand-signing research

Zoo notables 

 Alfred the Gorilla (1928-1948) lived in Bristol Zoo.
 Ah Meng (1960–2008) was a female Sumatran orangutan and a tourism icon of Singapore.
 Azalea, a chimpanzee living at the Korea Central Zoo known for her ability to smoke cigarettes
 Bill (1946–2007), a long-lived chimpanzee, resided at Sequoia Park Zoo in Eureka, California for 50 years.
 Binti Jua, a gorilla living in Brookfield Zoo, saved a boy in 1996.
 Bobo (1951–1968), a western lowland gorilla, lived in the Lowman family home in Anacortes, Washington from his infancy until 1953, and then Woodland Park Zoo in Seattle until his death.
 Bokito (born 1996), a silverback gorilla, escaped from the Blijdorp Zoo on 18 May 2007 and injured a woman.
 Bushman, a famous gorilla from Chicago's Lincoln Park Zoo, died in 1951. While alive, he brought over 100 million visitors to the zoo; his taxidermic remains can now be seen at Chicago's Field Museum of Natural History.
 Charles (born 1972), a wild-born silverback western lowland gorilla, resides at the Toronto Zoo and since 1974 has been renowned for his artwork.
 Charlie (1958–2010), a chimpanzee in a South African Zoo, was taught to smoke and was able to walk upright.
 Colo (1956–2017) was both the first gorilla born in captivity and, living to be 60, the oldest gorilla in captivity. She was born in the Columbus Zoo and lived there her entire life.
 Fifi, the matriarch of the chimpanzees at Sydney's Taronga Zoo, died on July 19, 2007 at age 60.
 Gust (1952–1988) was a Congolese gorilla that became an icon of the Antwerp Zoo
 Guy the Gorilla (1946–1978) was a famous gorilla in London Zoo.
 Harambe (1999–2016) was a gorilla shot dead by the Cincinnati Zoo after a child fell into his enclosure. This would eventually lead to the deceased ape becoming a popular Internet meme.
 Ivan (1962—2012) was a western lowland gorilla who lived in a shopping mall in Tacoma, Washington who was also the inspiration for the 2012 book The One and Only Ivan, which was then drafted into a 2020 film of the same name.
 Jabari, a 300-lb. (136 kg) gorilla at the Dallas Zoo, received national attention when, on Mar. 18, 2004, he escaped and attacked four people, including a toddler during a 40-minute rampage inside the jungle exhibit before being shot to death by police. He was the son of Charles the Gorilla.
 Jambo (1961–1992), a gorilla, cared for a boy who fell into his enclosure.
 Jenny (1953–2008), a western lowland gorilla, lived at the Dallas Zoo from 1957 until her death, and was the oldest gorilla in captivity at the time of her death.
 Jo Mendi II (1939-1980), a chimpanzee at the Detroit Zoo who became known as "the greatest performing chimp of all time."
 Julius (born 1979), a chimpanzee at Kristiansand Zoo and Amusement Park known for living his childhood with a human family. 
 Jumoke (1989–2008)—western lowland gorilla and the granddaughter of Colo
 Karen (born 1992), a Sumatran orangutan, who was the first zoo animal to have open heart surgery at San Diego Zoo in 1994.
 Ken Allen (1971–2000)—Bornean orangutan at the San Diego Zoo known for his escape artistry
 Little Mama (1938-2017) — chimpanzee, and believed to be the oldest chimpanzee on record 
 Louis, a male western lowland gorilla known for walking upright in order to avoid muddying his hands. Currently resides at Zoo de Granby in Granby, Quebec.
 Louie (chimpanzee) (2004–2011) — Louie was retired to the LRZ by his owners after a career in the entertainment industry. He was retired to LRZ with his older brother, Mikey.
 Massa (1930–1984) — silverback, one of the longest-lived gorilla ever recorded, and second-longest-lived male in captivity, died at age 54
 Max (1971–2004) — gorilla in the Johannesburg Zoo, famously apprehended a criminal in 1997, getting shot twice in the process
Ndume, a male western lowland gorilla known for learning a limited amount of a modified version of American Sign Language (ASL) and for being at the center of a lawsuit. Currently resides at Cincinnati Zoo in Cincinnati, Ohio.
 Pattycake (1972–2013), first baby gorilla born in New York, mother of 10, later died in captivity at Bronx Zoo
 Phil, was a lowland gorilla in the St. Louis Zoo. He arrived as a toddler on September 10, 1941, and died as a 525 lb. (238 kg) silverback on December 1, 1958.
 Ozzie (1961–2022) — western lowland gorilla the Zoo Atlanta.
 Sami (1979-1992) — chimpanzee at the Belgrade Zoo, known for escaping his enclosure twice in February of 1988
 Samson (1949–1981)—for many years the face of the Milwaukee County Zoo, one of the largest silverback gorillas on record, weighing 652 lbs. (296 kg) in 1973
 Santino, a male chimpanzee at Furuvik zoo in Sweden, was notable for having the cognitive skills for forward planning (calmly collecting stones, and later throwing them at visitors).
 Sebastian—former resident of the animal orphanage near Nairobi National Park, Kenya, famous for smoking and not requiring a cage.
 Shabani, a male western lowland gorilla known for his "photogenic" and "metrosexual" appearance, as well as his talent for tightrope walking. Currently resides at the Higashiyama Zoo in Nagoya, Japan.
 Snowflake (1964–2003), the only known albino lowland gorilla.
 Susie (1931 -1947) Cincinnati Zoo. One of the most popular animals at the zoo until her death on October 29, 1947.
Temara (born 1993), the first zoo-reared female Sumatran orangutan, was released into Bukit Tigapuluh National Park by Perth Zoo in 2006.
Timmy (gorilla) (1959-2011), died at 52 as the oldest male gorilla in North America 
Willie B. (1959–2000), a silverback gorilla kept in isolation for 27 years, became head of a troop and father of five.
 Yeroen, a chimpanzee at the Arnhem Zoo, was the star of de Waal's Chimpanzee Politics.

Circus use 
 Gargantua (1929–1949)—acid-scarred gorilla captured in the wild, performed in the Ringling Bros. and Barnum & Bailey Circus
 Toto (1931–1968)—Gargantua's would-be mate
 John Daniel and John Daniel II, Western gorillas that toured briefly with Ringling

As politicians 
 Macaco Tião, a chimpanzee, had the habit of throwing excrement at visitors (including several politicians) to the Rio de Janeiro Zoo. A satirical newspaper ran his candidature for Rio de Janeiro mayor in 1988, and he got 9.5% of the votes, just behind Marcello Alencar and César Maia.
Colossus the Gorilla was a main attraction at Benson's Wild Animal Farm in Hudson, New Hampshire, who attempted to have Colossus put on the ballot in the 1980 New Hampshire Republican Presidential primary. The zoo tried to argue that the U.S. Constitution does not specify that a native-born candidate has to be human.

Pets
Bubbles (b. 1983)—chimpanzee pet of singer Michael Jackson
 Moe, a chimpanzee who lived with a California couple until he was seized by authorities.
 Scatter—chimpanzee pet of singer Elvis Presley

See also 

 List of individual monkeys
 List of fictional primates
 Monkeys and apes in space
 Oldest hominoids

References

 
Apes